The 55th Regiment of Foot was a British Army infantry regiment, raised in 1755. After 1782 it had a county designation added, becoming known as the 55th (Westmorland) Regiment of Foot. Under the Childers Reforms it amalgamated with the 34th (Cumberland) Regiment of Foot to form the Border Regiment in 1881.

History

Formation

The regiment was raised in Stirling by Colonel George Perry as the 57th Regiment of Foot in 1755 for service in the Seven Years' War. It was re-ranked as the 55th Regiment of Foot, following the disbandment of the existing 50th and 51st regiments, in 1756.

French and Indian War service
The regiment embarked for North America for service in the French and Indian War and arrived in Nova Scotia on 8 July 1757 with the objective of taking part in the abandoned attack on the Fortress of Louisbourg. Following the death of Colonel Perry, Lord George Augustus Viscount Howe was appointed Colonel of the regiment in September 1757. After the regiment arrived in Albany, New York in November 1757, Howe accompanied Major Robert Rogers, commander of His Majesty's Independent Companies of Rangers on a scout, to learn the art of "bush fighting." Howe's willingness to learn from the American rangers and his interaction with subordinates won him the respect of both colonist and British redcoat being described as the "Idol of the army." In the spring of 1758, Howe began to train and accoutre the men in the regiment more like rangers to better adapt them to warfare in America. He was killed in a skirmish the day before the Battle of Carillon in July 1758.

After Howe's death John Prideaux was appointed commander of the regiment. In an unfortunate accident Prideaux was killed by the blast of a cohorn while walking through the entrenchments during the Battle of Fort Niagara in July 1759. The regiment, as part of General Jeffery Amherst's army, participated in the Battle of Ticonderoga and the capture of Fort Crown Point later that month.

In 1760 Colonel James Adolphus Oughton took command of the regiment and led it up the Saint Lawrence River: the regiment witnessed the Montreal Campaign between August to September 1760. William Gansell became the colonel of the regiment in 1762.

Pontiac's War
In summer 1763, volunteers from the regiment were sent to reinforce the British post at Fort Detroit, which was under siege from neighbouring Native Americans led by Pontiac. The British force was ambushed and badly mauled en route at the Battle of Bloody Run in July 1763. In 1764 many surviving members of the regiment were drafted into the 17th Regiment of Foot.  Anne Grant, whose father was an officer in the 55th Regiment, wrote; "they were going to become part of a regiment of no repute; whom they themselves had held in the utmost contempt when they formerly served together."

American Revolutionary War

The regiment returned to North America for the American Revolutionary War. The regiment fought at the Battle of Long Island in August 1776 and the Battle of Princeton in January 1777. It went on to take part in the Philadelphia campaign and saw action at the Battle of Brandywine in September 1777, the Battle of Paoli later that month and the Battle of Germantown in October 1777. The regiment was transferred to the West Indies in November 1778 and saw action at the Battle of St. Lucia in December 1778. Most of the regiment were captured at the siege of Brimstone Hill in February 1782 during the French invasion of Saint Kitts. The regiment adopted a county designation as the 55th (the Westmoreland) Regiment of Foot in August 1782.

Napoleonic Wars
In 1793 the regiment embarked for Flanders for service in the French Revolutionary Wars and saw action at the siege of Ypres in June 1794. It then moved to the West Indies and took part in the attack on Martinique in February 1794, on Saint Lucia in April 1794 and on Guadeloupe later that month as well as the capture of Saint Lucia in May 1796. It also helped suppress an insurrection by caribs on Saint Vincent in June 1796. After returning to England in 1797 the regiment landed at Ostend in 1798 for service in the Anglo-Russian invasion of Holland. It saw action at the Battle of Bergen in September 1799 and the Battle of Alkmaar in October 1799. After returning home in 1800 the regiment was deployed to the West Indies again in 1800 and went to the aid of Britain's new found Spanish allies during the Spanish reconquest of Santo Domingo in July 1809. The regiment returned home in 1812 and, having been sent to Holland in 1813, took part in the siege of Bergen op Zoom in March 1814.

The Victorian era

The regiment sailed for the Cape of Good Hope in 1819 and saw action in the Fifth Xhosa War. It also served in the Coorg War in 1834.

In 1841 the regiment was deployed to China for service in the First Opium War. It was selected as part of the expeditionary force that moved north from Hong Kong and participated in the Battle of Amoy in August 1841. The regiment was the first to land when British forces disembarked from boats at the Capture of Chusan in October 1841. It landed on a beach and then assaulted an enemy strong point called Guards Hill, where it ascended under heavy fire but eventually took the hill. It then proceeded to take the heights overlooking Tinghai and then immediately descended and placed its regimental colours on the walls of the city. After the battle, a detachment of the 55th and 18th Regiment of Foot were left to garrison the city. On 10 October 1841 the 55th again was part of the force that engaged Qing troops at the Battle of Chinhai: the regiment was left to garrison the city after the battle and remained there for the remainder of the year.

In 1842, the regiment saw action at Chapu in May, and Chinkiang in July. It then garrisoned Chinkiang until the Treaty of Nanking was signed. Part of the regiment remained in Hong Kong after the war. For its service during the war it was allowed the addition of a dragon badge superscribed "China" on its regimental colour.

The regiment saw active service in Turkey and Russia during the Crimean War. The regiment saw action at the Battle of Alma in September 1854, the Battle of Inkerman in November 1854 and the siege of Sevastopol in winter 1854. After returning home in 1857 it was deployed to India in 1863 and saw action during the Bhutan War in 1864.

As part of the Cardwell Reforms of the 1870s, where single-battalion regiments were linked together to share a single depot and recruiting district in the United Kingdom, the 55th was linked with the 34th (Cumberland) Regiment of Foot, and assigned to district no. 2 at Carlisle Castle. On 1 July 1881 the Childers Reforms came into effect and the regiment amalgamated with the 34th (Cumberland) Regiment of Foot to form the Border Regiment with the former 55th forming the 2nd battalion. There is a memorial chapel for the Border Regiment, housing the colours of the 55th regiment, at Kendal Parish Church.

Battle honours
The regiment received the following battle honours:
American Revolutionary War (1775–78); St Lucia, 1778
Crimean War (1854–55); Alma, Inkerman, Sevastopol

Victoria Crosses
Victoria Crosses awarded to men of the regiment were:
Private Thomas Beach, Crimean War (5 Nov 1854)
Brevet Major Frederick Cockayne Elton, Crimean War (29 March 1855)

Colonels
The Colonels of the regiment have been:

57th Regiment of Foot
1755–1757: Col Charles Perry

55th Regiment of Foot
1757–1758: Brig-Gen George Augustus Howe
1758–1759: Brig-Gen John Prideaux
1759–1762: Lt-Gen Sir James Adolphus Oughton
1762–1774: Lt-Gen William Gansell
1774–1775: Lt-Gen Richard Lambart, 6th Earl of Cavan
1775: Gen Sir Robert Pigot, 2nd Baronet
1775–1791: Gen James Grant

55th (Westmoreland) Regiment
1791–1811: Gen Loftus Anthony Tottenham
1811–1812: Lt-Gen Donald McDonald
1812–1814: Lt-Gen Sir Colin Campbell
1814–1846: Gen Sir William Henry Clinton
1846: Lt-Gen Alexander George Fraser, 17th Lord Saltoun
1846–1848: Lt-Gen John Wardlaw
1848–1855: Gen John Millet Hamerton
1855–1856: Lt-Gen Hon. Henry Edward Butler
1856–1857: Maj-Gen Hon. George Anson
1857–1861: Lt-Gen Sir James Holmes Schoedde
1861–1862: Gen Sir William Henry Elliott
1862–1873: Gen Sir Patrick Edmonstone Craigie
1873–1878: Gen Sir Philip Melmoth Nelson Guy
1878–1879: Gen Sir Edmund Haythorne
1879–1881: Gen Sir Henry Charles Barnston Daubeney

References

Sources

Further reading

External links
55th Regiment of Foot, Company of Light Infantry (1759-1764) (Archived 2009-10-22)  Living History group re-enacting the light infantry company of the 55th Regiment during the French and Indian War and Pontiac's Rebellion.
The 55th Regiment of Foot, Capt. James Taylor Trevor's Co'y Living History and reenactment unit portraying the 55th in 1776.
55th (the Westmorland) Regiment of Foot at regiments.org
55th (Westmorland) Regiment of Foot Cumbria's Museum of Military Life

Infantry regiments of the British Army
Military units and formations established in 1755
Military units and formations in Cumbria
Regiments of the British Army in the Crimean War
Regiments of the British Army in the American Revolutionary War
Military units and formations disestablished in 1881